National Highway 7 or National Road No.7 (10007) is one of the national highways of Cambodia. With a length of 509.17 km  it connects Skuon with Trapeang Kreal, international border checkpoint with Laos. It is part of Asian Highway Network and of the connection by road between Phnom Penh and Vientiane, joining Route 13 in Laos leading north along the Mekong to Luang Prabang.

In November 2004 it was announced that the reconstruction of the road, assisted by the Chinese government, would be partly rebuilt by China's Shanghai Construction Group. 
The public work, costing totally about US$80 million, was officially inaugurated on 29 April 2008.

References

Roads in Cambodia